Newark (also Pribble Mills) is an unincorporated community in Wirt County, West Virginia, United States.  Its elevation is 643 feet (196 m).

References

Unincorporated communities in Wirt County, West Virginia
Unincorporated communities in West Virginia